Borris (formerly Buirgheas Ó nDróna) is a village on the River Barrow, in County Carlow, Ireland. It lies on the R702 regional road.

Borris has views of the neighbouring countryside with Mount Leinster and the Blackstairs Mountains to the east, and the Barrow Valley to the west.  It is the home to Borris House, the ancestral home of the MacMurrough Kavanaghs.

Amenities

The village has one of the oldest golf courses in Ireland as well as a 16-arch limestone viaduct (the 16 Bridges) built in 1860 and designed by William le Fanu.  It has a hotel, "The Step House", a mixed national school and mixed vocational school (colloquially known as "The Tech" or "BVS"), a Roman Catholic church, three public houses, Bob's Bar, Joyce's and O'Shea's, three take-aways, Teddy's / Bennie's and The Jade Dragon, three convenience stores (Brophy's/Costcutters, O'Sheas/Centra and Borris Service Stn.). 

The old school closed in 1980 and has been used by different community groups including Scouting Ireland, which has a branch of Scouts, Cubs and Beavers there. It also houses CRISP (Carlow Rural Information Services Project). Recently a branch of Carlow County Library has opened in the old school buildings. Between the Library and CRISP, there is a Tourism Information Point.

Borris House caters for weddings and concerts (Mary Coughlan, Mundy) and a "Christmas at the Castle" event in December 2011.  It also played host to the National Country Fair in 2012. Borris House hosts the internationally acclaimed "Festival of Writing and Ideas" every summer.

History
 

The MacMurrough Kavanagh dynasty, former Irish Kings of Leinster, have been based in the town for some time. The family still live at Borris House in the town centre. Built in Tudor style, the house is open to groups by prior arrangement.

The village prospered in the late 1800s as Arthur MacMorrough Kavanagh, the landlord of the time, developed a sawmill and a lace-making industry. He also instigated the building of the 16-arch viaduct, situated at the lower end of the village, which was intended to carry the now defunct Great Southern and Western Railway line between Muine Bheag and Wexford. Borris railway station opened on 20 December 1858, closed for passenger traffic on 2 February 1931 and for goods traffic on 27 January 1947, finally closing altogether on 1 April 1963.

Housing developments in the area include Lodge Court, Woodlawn Park, Oak Tree Court, and Station Road.

Sports and clubs
Borris is home to Mount Leinster Rangers GAA Club, which was founded in 1988 with the amalgamation of 3 parish teams: Borris, Ballymurphy and Rathanna. In 2006 the club won its first senior hurling championship, beating St Mullin's in the final, and repeated the achievement again in 2007, beating the same opposition in the final. The club also won its first Leinster Intermediate Championship Title beating Celbridge in the final. Following a semi-final victory over Robert Emmets (London), the club reached their first All-Ireland final. The final was against Middleton Na Fianna from Armagh in Croke Park, with Rangers claiming their first ever All-Ireland Intermediate Hurling Title in game that finished 1-13 to 1-11.

3rd Carlow Borris Scout group was founded in 1983 and has won the national camping competition (Smythe Cup) on 3 occasions.

Notable people
 Sarah Breen, author and journalist
 Pat Byrne, winner of the first series of The Voice of Ireland
 Olivia O'Leary, journalist, writer and current affairs presenter

See also
 List of towns and villages in the Republic of Ireland

References

Towns and villages in County Carlow